Qaleh Sangi (also Romanized as Qal‘eh Sangī) is a village in Robat Rural District, in the Central District of Khorramabad County, Lorestan Province, Iran. At the 2006 census, its population was 979, in 199 families.

References 

Towns and villages in Khorramabad County